Alan Montagu-Stuart-Wortley-Mackenzie, 4th Earl of Wharncliffe (23 March 1935 – 3 June 1987), known as Viscount Carlton from birth until 1953, was a British landowner and peer, a member of the House of Lords from 1956 until his death.

The only son of Archibald Montagu-Stuart-Wortley-Mackenzie, 3rd Earl of Wharncliffe, and his wife Lady Elfrida Wentworth Fitzwilliam, daughter of the 7th Earl Fitzwilliam, he was educated at Eton College. He had four older sisters, one of whom married Henry Pelham-Clinton-Hope, 9th Duke of Newcastle. 

In 1953, Lord Carlton joined the Royal Navy as an able seaman, serving until 1953, when he succeeded as Earl of Wharncliffe, Viscount Carlton, of Carlton, Yorkshire, and Baron Wharncliffe of Wortley, all in the peerage of the United Kingdom. He was subsequently a drummer in a rock band, a motor mechanic, a publican and salesman.

Although his father had sold Wortley Hall, Wharncliffe inherited the Wharncliffe estate.

On 25 July 1957, Wharncliffe married Aline Margaret Bruce, a daughter of Robert Fernie Dunlop Bruce, of Dyson Holmes House, Wharncliffe, and they had two daughters:

Lady Joanna Margaret Montagu-Stuart-Wortley-Mackenzie (1959–1981), who was killed in a road accident at the age of 21;
Lady Rowena Montagu-Stuart-Wortley-Mackenzie (born 1961), who in 1986 married  John Hunt, son of Dr. G. H. Hunt. They took the name of Wortley-Hunt and have two children, Somerset Carlton Gerald Wortley-Hunt (born 1987) and Fleur Aline Isabel Montagu Stuart Wortley-Hunt (born 1989), but later divorced.

Wharncliffe died on 3 June 1987 at Wharncliffe House, Wortley, South Yorkshire, and was buried at St. Leonard's Church, Wortley.

He was succeeded in his peerages by 
an American cousin, Richard Montagu Stuart Wortley, a grandson of Ralph Granville Montagu-Stuart-Wortley (1864–1927), a younger brother of the second earl. However, he separated the peerages from the estate, leaving it to his immediate family. In July 1987, the 5th Earl, a construction foreman from Cumberland, Maine, arrived in Yorkshire as a tourist, to visit the family seat, which he had never seen. He commented “I am just an ordinary guy.”

The estate was ultimately inherited by Lady Rowena Wortley-Hunt, who took it over on her mother’s death in 2001.

Notes

External links
Alan James Montagu-Stuart-Wortley-Mackenzie, 4th Earl of Wharncliffe at National Portrait Gallery, London

1935 births
1987 deaths
Barons in the Peerage of the United Kingdom
Earls in the Peerage of the United Kingdom
Viscounts in the Peerage of the United Kingdom
Stuart of Bute family
Royal Navy sailors
People educated at Eton College